Omati, or Mini, is a Papuan language spoken in the Omati River area of Papua New Guinea. The two varieties, Barikewa and Mouwase, are quite divergent.

References

Turama–Kikorian languages
Languages of Papua New Guinea